Brent William Hilliard (born April 13, 1970) is an American volleyball player and coach who competed in the 1992 Summer Olympics.

He was born in San Gabriel, California.

In 1991 he led Long Beach State to its first NCAA Men's Volleyball Volleyball championship.

In 1992 he was a member of the American team which won the bronze medal in the Olympic tournament.

Hilliard was Associate Coach for women's volleyball at the University of San Diego for two decades and is currently head coach for women's volleyball at San Diego State University.

References

 

1970 births
Living people
American men's volleyball players
Volleyball players at the 1992 Summer Olympics
Olympic bronze medalists for the United States in volleyball
Medalists at the 1992 Summer Olympics
Long Beach State Beach men's volleyball players
San Diego State Aztecs women's volleyball
American volleyball coaches
Pan American Games medalists in volleyball
Pan American Games silver medalists for the United States
Medalists at the 1995 Pan American Games